Reality Check is the fourteenth studio album by American country music group The Bellamy Brothers. It was released in 1990 via MCA and Curb Records. The album includes the single "I Could Be Persuaded".

Track listing

Personnel
Adapted from liner notes.

The Bellamy Brothers
David Bellamy - vocals
Howard Bellamy - vocals

Musicians
Ed Enoch - background vocals
Paul Franklin - steel guitar
Vince Gill - background vocals
Emory Gordy Jr. - bass guitar, 6-string bass guitar
Jim Horn - saxophone
John Barlow Jarvis - keyboards
Tony King - background vocals
Mike Lawler - keyboards
Larrie Londin - drums
Jeff Ross - electric guitar
Larry Strickland - background vocals
Chuck Ward - keyboards
Biff Watson - acoustic guitar, electric guitar
Woody Wright - background vocals
Reggie Young - electric guitar

Chart performance

References

1990 albums
The Bellamy Brothers albums
Albums produced by Emory Gordy Jr.
MCA Records albums
Curb Records albums